Vranište is a village in Municipality of Struga, North Macedonia.

Demographics
As of the 2021 census, Vranište had 1,563 residents with the following ethnic composition:
Macedonians 1,471
Persons for whom data are taken from administrative sources 76
Albanians 8
Others 8

According to the 2002 census, the village had a total of 1,517 inhabitants. Ethnic groups in the village include:
 Macedonians 1,506
 Vlachs 4
 Serbs 4
 Other 3

Sports
Local football club FK Makedonija Vraništa play in the Macedonian Third League (Southwest Division).

References

Villages in Struga Municipality